Radical 197 or radical salt meaning "salt" is one of the 6 Kangxi radicals (214 radicals in total) composed of 11 strokes.

In the Kangxi Dictionary, there are 44 characters (out of 49,030) to be found under this radical.

Evolution

Derived characters

Literature

External links

Unihan Database - U+9E75

197
156